Meseda Bagaudinova (born 30 October 1983) is a Russian singer and ex-member of the popular pop group Nu Virgos (ВИА Гра).

Biography

Early life
Meseda Bagaudinova was born in Grozny, Chechnya, to an Avar father and a Ukrainian-Belarusian mother.

She graduated from the Rostov State College of Arts majoring in stage and jazz vocal. Then she performed as a vocalist in the Rostov pop-group "Dreams".

In 2005, she entered GITIS (Vladimir Nazarov's course).

After graduating GITIS, Meseda tried her luck in auditions for a popular TV show but she didn't make it and was turned down.

Nu Virgos
Meseda joined "Nu Virgos" on 1 April 2007 and in about three weeks, on 21 April, she made her debut at a concert in London.

She was introduced as the new member of the group to the larger public at the MUZ-TV premiere, on 1 June  2007.

She made her debut in the video clip 'Kiss'.

While Meseda was in the group, It released 2 CDs, 4 videoclips (Kiss, I'm Not Afraid, My Emancipation, American Wife), and won awards for best pop group, best video clip, best song, and more.

Meseda was numbered 26th in the list of '100 Most sexy girls of 2008' of the magazine Maxim.

On 19 January 2009, Meseda's removal from the group "Nu Virgos" was announced following the return of former founder member, Nadezhda Granovskaya.

Come Back
Meseda is planning to start a solo career in September 2009, with the help of her former producers, Dmitriy Kostiuk and Konstantin Meladze.

Rumours
Meanwhile, Meseda keeps making public appearances at parties, presentations and premieres. She has a stint in modeling and there is heavy speculation that she has had plastic surgery (botox, collagen injections) since leaving the group.

References

External links
 Official website
 

1983 births
Living people
People from Grozny
Chechen women singers
Russian women singers
Nu Virgos members